Acatenango (1982–2005) was a German Thoroughbred racehorse. Sired by the Deutsches Derby winner and German Champion sire, Surumu, he was out of the English mare Aggravate. Acatenango's ancestry includes German Champion sire Dark Ronald, the French Champion sire, Tantieme, English Triple Crown champion Gainsborough, and the most influential Italian sire, Nearco.

Racing in 1984 at age two, Acatenango's best finish was a third in the Ratibor-Rennen at Krefeld. In 1985 he embarked on a thirteen-race winning streak that tied a European record held by Ardross and Brigadier Gerard. Included in his wins was the Grosser Bavaria Preis, a listed race at Munich Racecourse and the important Group One Aral-Pokal at the Gelsenkirchen Racecourse in Gelsenkirchen. Acatenango's most important win that year came in the Deutsches Derby, the equivalent of the United Kingdom's Epsom Derby and America's Kentucky Derby. His performances earned him 1985 German Horse of the Year honors.
 
In 1986, Acatenango continued his winning streak. Usually ridden in Germany by jockey Andrzej Tylicki, under jockey Georg Bocskai he won his second Aral-Pokal, defeated Theatrical in winning the Grosser Preis von Berlin, and scored the first of his two consecutive wins in the Grosser Preis von Baden, Germany's most prestigious horse race. Racing outside of the country, in 1986 Steve Cauthen rode Acatenango to victory in the Group One Grand Prix de Saint-Cloud at the Saint-Cloud Racecourse in France. For the second year he was voted German Horse of the Year.

In 1987, Acatenango won his second straight Grosser Preis von Baden and was third to winner Triptych in the Coronation Cup at Epsom Downs in England. His performances earned him his third consecutive German Horse of the Year title.

Retired to stud duty at his owner's breeding farm, Acatenango was the leading sire in Germany  in 1993, 1995, 1997, 1999, and 2001. His sons and daughters include:
  Lando, winner of the 1993 Deutsches Derby and the 1995 Japan Cup
 Borgia, the 1997 Deutsches Derby and Grosser Preis von Baden winner 
 Fraulein, winner in Canada of the 2002 E. P. Taylor Stakes.
 Blue Canari, winner in France of the 2004 Prix du Jockey Club
 Sabiango, won the 2001 Rheinland-Pokal, 2003 Deutschland-Preis, and in the United States the 2004 Charles Whittingham Memorial Handicap 
 Nicaron, won the 2005 Deutsches Derby
 Dalicia, won the 2005 Preis der Sparkassen-Finanzgruppe, dam of the 2011 Kentucky Derby winner Animal Kingdom 
 Wurftaube, won the 1996 German St. Leger, dam of 2011 Deutsches Derby winner Waldpark and Waldmark dam of Masked Marvel
Due to declining fertility Acatenango was retired from stud duties in 2004. He was  humanely euthanized on 2 April 2005 at the age of 23 following an accident in his paddock.

References
 Racing Career
 Progeny
 2 April 2005 Bloodhorse article on the death of Acatenango

1982 racehorse births
2005 racehorse deaths
Racehorses bred in Germany
Racehorses trained in Germany
German Thoroughbred Horse of the Year
Thoroughbred family 11-a